Tycoon was an American rock band from New York City. The group released two records on Arista Records. Their eponymous debut album charted one Top 40 hit single in 1979, "Such a Woman" (U.S. Billboard Hot 100 #26, AUS #99), and it was produced by Robert John "Mutt" Lange. Their 1981 album, Turn Out the Lights, was produced by Vini Poncia.

Members
Norman Mershon (vocals, guitar)
Jon Gordon (Guitar)
Bobby Messano (guitar, vocals)
Mark Rivera (saxophone, vocals)
Keith Taylor (keyboards)
Mark Kreider (bass, violin, vibes)
Richard Steinberg / Mike Braun (drums)

Discography
Tycoon (Arista Records, 1979) U.S. #41, AUS #59
Turn Out the Lights (Arista, 1981)
Opportunity Knocks (Self Produced, 1983) available at the "It's About Music" web site

References

External links
 Tycoon page at It's About Music

Musical groups from New York City